The 2022 T20I Nordic Cup was a cricket tournament played in Denmark from 7 to 8 May 2022, in the form of a three-match Twenty20 International (T20I) bilateral series between the men's national teams of Denmark and Finland. Two games between Denmark and Finland 'A' teams were also included in the tour, scheduled before and after the T20I series. The venue for all of the matches was Svanholm Park in Brøndby. The event provided both teams with preparation for the 2022–23 ICC Men's T20 World Cup Europe Qualifier subregional tournaments. Finland won the first T20I by three wickets, but Denmark then went on to win the next two matches to win the series 2–1.

Squads

T20I series

1st T20I

2nd T20I

3rd T20I

'A' series

1st T20

2nd T20

References

External links
 Series home at ESPN Cricinfo

Associate international cricket competitions in 2022
T20I Nordic Cup